This is a list of gliders/sailplanes of the world, (this reference lists all gliders with references, where available) 
Note: Any aircraft can glide for a short time, but gliders are designed to glide for longer.

T

Tachikawa 
(Tachikawa Aircraft Company Limited (立川飛行機株式会社, Tachikawa Kōkūki K.K.?))
 Tachikawa Ki-23
 Tachikawa Ki-25

Taglioretti
(Raúl Taglioretti)
 Taglioretti RT-1

Tainan
(Tainan Industry Co.)
 Tainan Mita 3

Takács
 Takács III

Takatori
 Takatori SH-1
 Takatori SH-8 Flider
 Takatori SH-15
 Takatori SH-16S
 Takatori SH-18 Mammoth

Tamworth
 Tamworth Brolga (glider)

Tangent Aircraft
 Tangent EMG-5

Tański
(Czesław Tański)
 Tański Lotnia (Tańskiego) I
 Tański Lotnia (Tańskiego) II
 Tański Lotnia (Tańskiego) III

Tarczyński-Stępniewski
(Tadeusz Tarczyński & Wiesław Stępniewski)
 Tarczyński and Stępniewki TS-1/34 Promyk

Taylor-Moore
(Lewis Taylor &  Ted Moore)
 Taylor-Moore 1931 glider

Taylorcraft 
 Taylorcraft LBT
 Taylorcraft LNT
 Taylorcraft TG-6
 Taylorcraft Model H

Technicair
(Technicair Ltd. Heston, Middlesex)
 Technicair Trainee

Technoflug 
(Technoflug Leichtflugzeugbau GmbH)
 Technoflug Piccolo
 Technoflug TKF-2 Carat

Tedeschi
(Enzo Tedeschi / Associazone Aeronautica Modena (Italia))
 Tedeschi E.T.186

Teichfuss 
(Luigi Teichfuss)
 Teichfuss Allievo Pavullo
 Teichfuss Allievo Pavullo Biposto
 Teichfuss Astore
 Teichfuss Balilla
 Teichfuss Biposto Scuola (not built)
 Teichfuss Borea
 Teichfuss Cicogna
 Teichfuss Condor 1
 Teichfuss Condor 2 (LT.02 FIDIA)
 Teichfuss Falco
 Teichfuss Gabbiano
 Teichfuss Grifo
 Teichfuss LT.03
 Teichfuss LT.10
 LT.12 Biposto
 Teichfuss LT.30
 LT.35 Borea (built but not flown)
 Teichfuss Nibio 1
 Teichfuss Nibio 2 Freccia Nera
 Teichfuss Orione 1
 Teichfuss Orione 2 (not built)
 Ornitottero (Aerocicloplano)
 Teichfuss Sparviero
 Teichfuss Super Grifo
 Teichfuss Tenax
 Teichfuss Turbine

TeST
(TeST sro (Division of Comp-Let sro), Velké Meziříĉi)
 TeST TST-1 Alpin
 TeST TST-3 Alpin T
 TeST TST-5 Variant
 TeST TST-6 Duo
 TeST TST-7 Junior
 TeST TST-9 Junior
 TeST TST-10 Atlas
 TeST TST-13 Junior
 TeST TST-14 Bonus
 TeST TST-14J BonusJet

THK 
(Türk Hava Kurumu)
 THK-01 – WĘDRYCHOWSKI, J. & DULĘBA, Leszka & ROGALSKI, Stanisław & TEISSEYRE, Jerzy – Türk Hava Kurumu
 THK-03 – JACOBS, Hans & DFS – (DFS Habicht)
 THK-04 – SSCB – Türk Hava Kurumu (АНТОНОВ УС-4 (Antonov US-4))
 THK-07 – Antonov, Oleg Konstantinovich & SSBC – Türk Hava Kurumu (Antonov PS-2)
 THK-09 – SCHAWROW, W. B. & SSCB – Türk Hava Kurumu
 THK-13

Tingskou
(Paul Tingskou – built by Oscar "Pete" Peterson)
 Tingskou Viking 104

Todhunter 
(Reg W. Todhunter)
 Todhunter T-5 Blue Wren
 Todhunter Twin Plank

Teruhiko
(Ukai Teruhiko)
 Teruhiko Eagle  (霧ケ峰式鷹型)

Tervamäki
(Jukka Tervamäki)
 Tervamäki JT-6
 Tervamäki JT-8

Tērvete
 Tērvete (glider)

Thoenes
(Alexander Thoenes)
 Thoenes Alexander-der-Kleine –

Thomas
(A. Thomas)
 Thomas 1923 glider

Thomas
(R.R. Thomas)
 Thomas Primary 1930,

Thorouss
(Gustave Thorouss)
 Thorouss 1922 glider

Tikhonravov
( M. K. Tikhonravov)
 Tikhonravov AVF-1 Aral – (Тихонравова АВФ-1 Арап) – M. K. Tikhonravov – Aviarabotnik

Timm
(Timm Aircraft Company)
 Timm AG-2

Timmins
(Dennis Timmins)
 Timmins 1930 glider

Tolstoï-Zeyvang
(I. L. Tolstoï, G. P. Tolstoï & K. Zeyvang)
 Tolstoï-Zeyvang Korchoun (aka Толстых Коршун - Tolstoï Cerf-volant)

Tokyo University
 Tokyo University 1909 glider

Tomasini
(Charles Tomasini)
 Tomasini 1923 glider

Tomaszewski-Muraszew
( H. Tomaszewski & A. Muraszew)
 Tomaszewski-Muraszew MT-1

Torino
()
 Torino 26
 Torino 27
 Torino 28
 Torino 41

Torva 
 Torva 15 Sprite
 Torva 15 Sport

Toso
(Ilare Fauto Toso & Baricelli Gaudencio Toso)
 Toso I 
 Toso II
 Toso Motoplaneador

Tóth
 Tóth Furnér-Gép

Trager-Bierens
(Kempes Trager and John Bierens)
 Trager-Bierens T-3 Alibi

Tramdachs
(Fricis Tramdachs)
 Tramdachs YL-12
 Tramdachs YL-13
 Tramdachs YL-14

Trejbal-Prasil
 Trejbal-Prasil Rok Vyroby

Trucet
(Jean-Marc Truchet)
 Truchet Tr-301 Abyssin

TsAGI 
(Tsentral'nyy Aerodinamicheskiy i Gidrodinamicheskiy Institut- central aerodynamics and hydrodynamics institute)
 TsAGI BP-1 – SENKOW
 TsAGI BP-2 – BIELIAJEV
 TsAGI BP-3 – BIELIAJEV
 TsAGI MAI 68

Tsuno
(Takishiro Tsuno / Teikoku Syounenn (Tokyo Motor Boat) / Kyushu University (天風 水陸両用) )
 Temptu T-2 Kuken 2600 (天風 水陸両用)

Tsybin 
(Pavel Vladimirovič Tsybin / OKB Tsybin)
 Tsybin UL-1 (Цыбин УЛ-1)
 Tsybin Ts-25 (Цыбин Ц-25)

Tułacz
(Piotr Tulacz)
 Tułacz M.1

Tunzeng
(Jan Tunzeng)
 Tunzeng Zobor 1
 Tunzeng Zobor 2

Tupolev
(Andrei Nikolayevich Tupolev)
 Tupolev TB-6 glider
 Tupolev ANT-33

Turbay
( Alfredo Turbay)
 Turbay T-2 Cadet (designation re-used for a later twin-engined design)
 Turbay T-3 Cadet (designation re-used for a later twin-engined design)

Tweed
(George Tweed)
 Tweed GT-1

TWI
(TWI Flugzeug GmbH)
 TWI Taifun
 TWI Kiwi

Twist Master
 Twist Master

Notes

Further reading

External links

Lists of glider aircraft